Romain Zingle (born 29 January 1987 in Lobbes) is a Belgian former cyclist, who competed professionally between 2009 and 2015 for the  and  teams.

Major results

2008
 2nd Liège–Bastogne–Liège Espoirs
 2nd Paris–Tours Espoirs
 2nd Circuit de Wallonie
 10th Overall Circuit des Ardennes
2009
 1st Circuit de Wallonie
 2nd Overall Le Triptyque des Monts et Châteaux
 2nd Overall Circuit des Ardennes
 2nd Liège–Bastogne–Liège Espoirs
 3rd Time trial, National Under-23 Road Championships
 5th Paris–Mantes-en-Yvelines
2011
 7th Brabantse Pijl
 8th Overall Circuit de Lorraine
2013
 4th Polynormande
 8th Overall La Tropicale Amissa Bongo
2014
 9th Classic Loire Atlantique

Grand Tour general classification results timeline

References

External links

Belgian male cyclists
Living people
1987 births
Cyclists from Hainaut (province)
People from Lobbes